Hans Cieslarczyk (3 May 1937 – 10 June 2020) was a German football player and coach.

During his club career, he played for SV Sodingen, Borussia Dortmund, Westfalia Herne, and Karlsruher SC. He also played seven times for the Germany national football team, scoring three goals, and participated in the 1958 FIFA World Cup.

References

External links
 
 
 

1937 births
2020 deaths
German footballers
Germany international footballers
Germany B international footballers
Germany under-21 international footballers
Karlsruher SC players
Borussia Dortmund players
Bundesliga players
1958 FIFA World Cup players
German football managers
FC Augsburg managers
SpVgg Greuther Fürth managers
SC Westfalia Herne players
Stuttgarter Kickers managers
1. FC Saarbrücken managers
People from Herne, North Rhine-Westphalia
Sportspeople from Arnsberg (region)
Offenburger FV managers
Association football forwards
Footballers from North Rhine-Westphalia